Levoberezhny (masculine), Levoberezhnaya (feminine), or Levoberezhnoye (neuter) may refer to:
Levoberezhny District, several districts and city districts in Russia
Levoberezhny (rural locality) (Levoberezhnaya, Levoberezhnoye), several rural localities in Russia

See also
Livoberezhna (disambiguation)
Pravoberezhny (disambiguation)